The Big Throwdown is the third album by  Cleveland, Ohio-based R&B group LeVert.

Reception

Released in 1987, led by the number one R&B and top five Pop single, "Casanova", this album would go ahead and chart at number three on the Billboard R&B Albums charts.

Track listing
"Casanova" (Reggie Calloway)  6:25
"Good Stuff" (Gerald Levert, Tommie Miller)  4:20
"Don't U Think It's Time" (Gerald Levert, Marc Gordon)  4:28
"My Forever Love" (Gerald Levert, Marc Gordon)  4:35
"Love the Way U Love Me" (Marc Gordon) 4:42
"Sweet Sensation" (Gerald Levert, Marc Gordon)  4:20
"In N Out" (Gerald Levert, Sean Levert, Marc Gordon)  4:30
"Temptation" (Reggie Calloway, Vincent Calloway, Joel Davis, Gloria Larson)  8:48
"Throwdown" (Gerald Levert, Sean Levert, Marc Gordon)  4:16

Personnel
Gerald Levert - Lead and Backing Vocals
Sean Levert -  Backing Vocals
Marc Gordon - Keyboards, Backing Vocals
David Ervin - Drums, Keyboards
Gene Robinson, Johnny "T" Jones, Robert Cunningham, Norman Harris - Guitar 
Joel Davis, Odeen Mays, Jr., Craig Cooper, David Ervin - Keyboards
Mike Ferguson - Bass
Sam Peak -Saxophone
Jim Salamone - Percussion

Charts

Weekly charts

Year-end charts

Singles

References

External links
 

1987 albums
LeVert albums
Atlantic Records albums